Mannequin Two: On the Move is a 1991 romantic comedy film and a sequel to the 1987 film Mannequin. The film stars Kristy Swanson as a "peasant girl" named Jessie who is enchanted by an evil sorcerer's magic necklace, freezing her in the form of a wooden mannequin. She is to remain frozen for one thousand years, or until the necklace is removed by the person who will be her true love. In modern day Philadelphia, she is freed by Jason Williamson (William Ragsdale), a new employee of the Prince & Company department store and the descendant of Jesse's original love. The two fall in love while avoiding Count Spretzle (Terry Kiser), the descendant of the evil sorcerer.

The original film's theme song "Nothing's Gonna Stop Us Now" by Starship, written by Diane Warren and Albert Hammond, was featured in this film. The original music score was composed by David McHugh. Though the sequel takes place in the same Philadelphia department store Prince & Company as the original film, only actors Mesach Taylor and Andrew Hill Newman returned from the original film. While Taylor reprises the role of Hollywood Montrose and briefly references having witnessed a similar romance during the first film, it is unclear if Newman plays the same character as he did in the first film or is portraying a new character.

Plot
In the year 1391, Prince William of the small Germanic kingdom of Hauptmann-Koenig falls in love with a peasant girl named Jessie. Not approving of the romance, the queen plots with her court sorcerer Spretzel, who enchants a necklace intended for Jessie. Putting on the necklace, she is transformed into a wooden statue and the magic prevents William from freeing her. He is told Jessie will be frozen for a thousand years and can only wake earlier if a true love from another land removes the necklace. Angry, William declares the kingdom will then also be cursed for a thousand years. Perpetual rainfall begins.

"Almost" one thousand years later, Hauptmann-Koenig is a poor country enduring endless rain and financial hardship. Jessie stands as a museum piece in the castle, where a tour guide recites the fairy tale of the "Enchanted Peasant Girl." To boost tourism, Count Gunther Spretzle sends the statue to be displayed at the Prince & Company department store in Philadelphia. The store will do a dramatic stage presentation celebrating the Hauptman-Koenig's history and culture. Secretly, Count Spretzle is the descendant of the sorcerer and knows the fairy tale is true. When Jessie awakens in a few days, he plans to make her his bride and then escape to Bermuda with his henchmen, using stolen crown jewels to fund his retirement.

In the Germantown section of Northwest Philadelphia, Jason Williamson, a descendant of Prince William, lives with his mother who runs a matchmaking service. He begins work at Prince & Company where store manager Mr. James makes him assistant to visual merchandising head Hollywood Montrose, who is directing the Enchanted Peasant Girl presentation. When the delivery truck with the Hauptmann-Koenig artifacts crashes over the Schuylkill River, Hollywood and James arrive on the scene. Seeing a female figure falls into the river, Jason saves her, only then realizing it's the statue from Europe. Jessie is briefly restored to life when Jason touches her necklace.

Back at Prince & Company, Jason is romantically drawn to Jessie. Removing her necklace with ease, he is shocked when she comes to life. Learning she is in the future, Jessie concludes Jason is William reincarnated. Jason shows Jessie the modern world and they have a whirlwind romance, sharing their feelings, dreams, and cultures with each other. The next morning, unaware of its magic, Jessie puts on her necklace and is frozen again. Heartbroken and unsure what to do, Jason returns the statue to Prince & Company.

Admiring Jessie's necklace, Hollywood tries it on, becoming a statue and restoring her to life. Jessie leaves to explore the mall. Spretzle's henchmen find Hollywood, remove the necklace, then rush to find Jessie. The Queen of Hauptman-Koenig then calls Spretzle, warning him she knows the crown jewels are missing. Jason finds Hollywood and explains Jessie came to life. Hollywood believes him, remarking, "This has happened before."

Recognizing Jason is William reincarnated, Spretzel tries to kill him.  Seeing Spretzel's henchmen, Jessie takes a go-kart and escapes to Jason's home.  Spretzle and the authorities follow Jason to his home.  The count confronts Jessie alone and puts the necklace on her.  Seeing her frozen again, Jason realizes the necklace is cursed and demands it be removed.  The cops (Hollywood calls them "The Heat"), believing he is unhealthily fixated on a mannequin, arrest him for theft.  Spretzle wants to leave with Jessie but Mr. James reminds the count they have a contract and a show happening tomorrow.

The next day, Hollywood dresses in his former US Marine Corps uniform and bluffs a policeman into releasing Jason into his custody. At the Enchanted Peasant Girl presentation, Jason removes Jessie's necklace on stage, restoring her to life in front of spectators who assume it is part of the show. Enraged, Spretzle takes Jessie and forces her into his hot air balloon. Jason follows and they struggle. Jessie puts the necklace on Spretzle, repeating the ancient curse. The now-frozen Spretzle is knocked out of the balloon and smashes into pieces on the street.

Later in Hauptmann-Koenig, the glued together statue of Count Spretzle is the castle centerpiece and inspires his own fairy tale. Meanwhile, the newly married Jason and Jessie pick up a new necklace at Prince & Company before leaving on their honeymoon.

Cast
 Kristy Swanson as Jessie
 William Ragsdale as Jason Williamson/Prince William
 Meshach Taylor as Hollywood Montrose/Club Doorman
 Terry Kiser as Count Gunther Spretzle/Sorcerer
 Stuart Pankin as Mr. James
 Cynthia Harris as Mrs. Williamson/Queen
 Andrew Hill Newman as Andy Ackerman
 Robert Pilarski as Bob

Production
The first film had been financially successful and the production company wanted a sequel. A script was written and David Begelman hired Stewart Raffill, who had made The Ice Pirates (1984) for Begelman earlier, to direct. Raffill said his philosophy was "just to play the humor" and look for interesting reactions to the situations. Filming took place in Philadelphia at Wanamaker's department store. Raffill said that Swanson "was a charm to work with".

Soundtrack

Reception

Unlike its predecessor, it was a box office bomb, grossing just less than $4 million against its $13 million budget.

On Rotten Tomatoes, it has an approval rating of 13% based on reviews from 23 critics, with the critic consensus being “Chock full of clichéd gags and glaring product placement, Mannequin: On the Move is even more lifeless than its woeful predecessor.” Audiences surveyed by CinemaScore gave the film a grade of "B" on scale of A+ to F. This sequel was dubbed as "one of the worst follow-ups ever made."

Variety gave it a negative review: "It took four writers to struggle with another idea of why a mannequin would come to life in a department store and what would happen if she did." Kevin Thomas of the Los Angeles Times called it "even more feeble than the original" and "insipid in the extreme".

David Cornelius of DVD Talk called it "as woefully incompetent as its predecessor".

Home media
Mannequin Two: On the Move was first released on VHS and LaserDisc in 1992 by Live Home Video. MGM Home Entertainment released the film to DVD for the first time on January 16, 2008 as part of a double feature two-disc set with the first Mannequin as the first disc. Mannequin Two: On the Move was released on Blu-ray for the first time by Olive Films (under license from MGM) on September 22, 2015.

References

External links
 
 

1991 films
1991 independent films
1991 romantic comedy films
1990s fantasy comedy films
1990s romantic fantasy films
American fantasy comedy films
American independent films
American romantic comedy films
American romantic fantasy films
American sequel films
1990s English-language films
Films directed by Stewart Raffill
Films set in the 14th century
Films set in department stores
Films set in Philadelphia
Films shot in Philadelphia
20th Century Fox films
Metro-Goldwyn-Mayer films
Mannequins in films
Films about curses
1990s American films